Exfoliation can refer to:

 Exfoliation (botany), the loss of leaves (or, in some cases, pieces of bark) from a plant
 Exfoliation (cosmetology), a cosmetic technique that aims to remove dead skin from the body and face 
 Exfoliation (geology), a process resulting in parallel fractures in the surface of rock 
 Exfoliation corrosion (metallurgy), a severe type of intergranular corrosion 
 Exfoliation - Intercalation (chemistry), the complete separation of the layers of a material
 Exfoliation syndrome, an eye disease

See also 
 Exfoliative dermatitis, sometimes known as erythroderma, a skin disease process involving redness and scaling of most or all of the sufferer's skin, with various causes